TSC Berlin might refer to:

TSC Berlin (basketball)
TSC Berlin (football)